A carboy, also known as a demijohn or a lady jeanne, is a rigid container with a typical capacity of . Carboys are primarily used for transporting liquids, often water or chemicals.

They are also used for in-home fermentation of beverages, often beer or wine.

History and etymology 

The word carboy is from the Persian qarābah (قرابه), from Middle Persian Karāvah. Arabic also borrowed it as qarrāba, meaning "big jug". The Spanish-language term is garrafa.

Demijohn originally referred to any glass vessel with a large body and small neck, enclosed in wickerwork. The word presumably comes from the French dame-jeanne, literally "Lady Jane", as a popular appellation; this word is first attested in France in the 17th century. In Italian it is called damigiana, most probably derived from French. In some Spanish-speaking countries such as Argentina, it is also referred to as damajuana. An alternative etymology derives it from the name of a Persian town, Damghan, but there is no evidence for this.

Size
The term carboy itself usually refers to a  carboy, unless otherwise noted. A  carboy is sometimes called a jug. A  carboy is usually called a demijohn (in the Philippines, dama juana).

In Britain, "demijohn" refers to a  glass brewing vessel.

Brewing
In brewing, a carboy or demijohn is a glass or plastic vessel used in fermenting beverages such as wine, mead, cider, perry, and beer. Usually it is fitted with a rubber stopper and a fermentation lock to prevent bacteria and oxygen from entering during the fermentation process.

During the homebrewing process, a primary carboy is used for fermentation. Once primary fermentation is complete, the beer is either transferred to a secondary carboy for conditioning or it can be transferred directly to bottles for conditioning. (This process of transferring is usually called racking.)

Laboratory
In modern laboratories, carboys are usually made of plastic, though traditionally were (and still are in many university settings) made of ferric glass or other shatter-resistant glasses immune to acid corrosion or halide staining common in older plastic formulations. They are used for storing large quantities of liquids, such as solvents or deionised water. In these applications, a tap may be included for dispensing. Carboys are also used to collect and store waste solvents. Collecting waste solvents in plastic carboys is preferable to reusing glass Winchesters due to the lesser chance of breakage if a solution is placed in an incorrectly labeled carboy. Polypropylene carboys are also commonly used in laboratories to transfer purified water. They are typically filled at the top and have a spigot at the bottom for dispensing.

See also
 Amphora - another large container used from 6000 BCE to the present, mostly for wine
 Fermentation (food)
 Jerrycan – another large-sized fluid container

References

External links

 Big Bottles Big History: Demijohns and Carboys 

Vessels
Homebrewing
Laboratory glassware
Wine packaging and storage